Filipp Olegovich Yankovsky is a Russian actor and film director. He was born on October 10, 1968, to actor Oleg Yankovsky.

Life and career
Filipp Yankovsky was born October 10, 1968, in Saratov in the family of actors Oleg Yankovsky and Lyudmila Zorina. At that time, his parents played at the Saratov Drama Theater. When Filipp turned four, the family moved to Moscow.

His first role as an actor was in the 1974 film The Mirror by Andrei Tarkovsky. In the same year he had an uncredited role in Under a Stone Sky. Filipp's first role as a grown-up was in Sentimental Journey to Potatoes (1986).

In 1990 he graduated from the Moscow Art Theater School (Oleg Tabakov's course). Then he studied at VGIK from 1990 until 2004 at the directing faculty (workshop of Vladimir Naumov).

Yankovsky began his directorial career with music videos — he has made approximately 150 music videos. In 1997, he was nominated for the Ovation Award as the best music video director.

He made his directorial debut in 2002 with the feature film In Motion, for which he was awarded the "Discovery of the Year" prize at the Nika Awards in 2003 and the audience award at Kinotavr. The film was about Sasha Guriev (Konstantin Khabensky), a successful and charming journalist who suddenly realizes that he has found compromising evidence on his politician friend.

His next directorial work was the 2005 screen version of Boris Akunin's detective novel The State Counsellor. Oleg Menshikov, Nikita Mikhalkov and Konstantin Khabensky were the lead actors of the picture. In 2006 he directed The Sword Bearer which starred Artyom Tkachenko and Chulpan Khamatova.

Personal life

Family
Wife - Oksana Fandera, actress; children:
Son - Ivan Yankovsky (born October 30, 1990), actor.
Daughter - Elizaveta Yankovskaya (born May 1, 1995).

Health
When Filipp was 41, he was diagnosed with lymphoma. In 2016 it was reported that Yankovsky has been cured from stage III cancer, after undergoing chemotherapy seven times.

Selected filmography
As actor:

 1974 The Mirror (Зеркало) as 5-year-old Alyosha
 1986 Sentimental Journey to the Potato (Сентиментальное путешествие на картошку)
 1991 Afghan Breakdown (Афганский излом) as Nikita Steklov, senior lieutenant
 2005  The State Counsellor (Статский советник) as a drunk hussar
 2011 Raspoutine (Распутин) as  Felix Yusupov
 2013 The Three Musketeers (Три мушкетера) as Louis XIII of France
 2014 Wonderworker (Чудотворец) as Nikolai Arbenin
 2016 Mysterious passion (Таинственная страсть)  as Yan Tushinsky
 2016 Brutus (Брут) as Horst
 2022 We (Мы)
As director
 2002 In Motion (В движении)
 2005  The State Counsellor (Статский советник)
 2006 The Sword Bearer (Меченосец)
 2008 Rock Head (Каменная башка)

References

Bibliography
 Holmstrom, John. The Moving Picture Boy: An International Encyclopaedia from 1895 to 1995. Norwich, Michael Russell, 1996, p. 371.

Russian male actors
1968 births
Russian film directors
Living people
Russian people of Polish descent
Recipients of the Nika Award
Soviet male actors
Moscow Art Theatre School alumni
Actors from Saratov